Chien Pei-chi (born 13 June 1971) is a Taiwanese softball player. She competed in the women's tournament at the 1996 Summer Olympics.

References

External links
 

1971 births
Living people
Taiwanese softball players
Olympic softball players of Taiwan
Softball players at the 1996 Summer Olympics
Place of birth missing (living people)
Asian Games medalists in softball
Softball players at the 2002 Asian Games
Medalists at the 2002 Asian Games
Asian Games silver medalists for Chinese Taipei
21st-century Taiwanese women